Macarostola rosacea is a moth of the family Gracillariidae. It is known from New South Wales, Australia.

References

Macarostola
Moths described in 1940